Anatoly Georgievich Basistov (23 Oktober, 1920 – 16 September 1998) was a Soviet and Russian scientist in the field of radio engineering and electronics. Hero of Socialist Labour.

Biography 
He was born in 1920 in the Saratov.

From 1938 to 1941 he studied at the Moscow Power Engineering Institute, then, because of the beginning of the Great Patriotic War, he moved to the Leningrad Air Force Academy of the Red Army, which he graduated in 1944. From August 1944 in the army he fought as navigator of the aviation regiment.

After the war ended, he remained in the Ministry of Defense of the USSR. Since 1950, he worked in the KB-1 of the Ministry of Defense Industry, then at the Ministry of Radio Industry's CB to create air defense systems, where he took part in the development of the multi-channel anti-aircraft anti-aircraft defense system of Moscow.

Since 1968 he worked at the Vympel Special Design Bureau (OKB) on the development of anti-missile defense (ABM) systems, participated in the development of the S-200 multi-channel long-range anti-aircraft missile system.

For the development of the complex S-200, received the title of Hero of Socialist Labour.

The main scientific works are devoted to improving the efficiency of signal filtering and the resolution of radar systems; the development of multifunctional missile defense information systems based on radar facilities and optoelectronic devices controlled by high-performance ground and on-board computers; the development of complexes of control systems of aircraft, affecting air and space objects.

Literature 
 Щит России: системы противоракетной обороны. МГТУ, 2009 - 520 стр.

References 

1920 births
1998 deaths
20th-century Russian engineers
Scientists from Saratov
Central Committee of the Communist Party of the Soviet Union candidate members
Corresponding Members of the Russian Academy of Sciences
Corresponding Members of the USSR Academy of Sciences
Academic staff of the Moscow Institute of Physics and Technology
Moscow Power Engineering Institute alumni
Heroes of Socialist Labour
Recipients of the Medal of Zhukov
Recipients of the Order of Lenin
Recipients of the Order of the Red Banner of Labour
Recipients of the Order of the Red Star
State Prize of the Russian Federation laureates
Russian engineers
Soviet engineers
Burials in Troyekurovskoye Cemetery